Masjid Bencoolen (Jawi: , ; Also known as Bengkali Mosque) is a mosque in Bencoolen Street, Singapore. Masjid Bencoolen can accommodate 1,100 worshipers. The mosque is co-located and integrated with a 12-storey Somerset Bencoolen serviced apartment tower.

History
Founded in 1825, the building was originally an attap mosque built by Bencoolen Muslims. The building was later replaced in 1845 by a permanent version built by an Arab merchant, Syed Omar bin Aljunied. In 2001, due to redevelopment of the area, it was demolished for Somerset Bencoolen, a mixed used residential complex. The mosque itself is integrated into the building and opened in 2004.

In 2019, it was announced that it would undergo a 15-month long upgrading programme estimated to cost S$4 million, which increased the capacity from around 450 to 1,450 congregants.

Today
The mosque has very much retained its Indian heritage since its founding. This can be seen in mosque's official name and signboards. Sermons and religious classes are also offered in Tamil. The mosque is usually crowded during Friday prayers as workers from the nearby offices gather for the compulsory prayers. The mosque is fully air conditioned. There are ample parking facilities located at the basement of the mosque.

Transportation
The mosque is accessible from Bencoolen MRT station.

See also
 Islam in Singapore
 List of mosques in Singapore

References

External links

2004 establishments in Singapore
Mosques completed in 2004
Bencoolen